HMS Surprise was a Vigilant-class gunvessel of the Royal Navy. She was launched at Blackwall Yard, London in 1856 and broken up in Plymouth in 1866.

Design
Her class were designed as second-class despatch and gunvessels.  They were intended to operate close inshore during the Crimean War and were essentially enlarged versions of the Arrow-class gunvessel, which has been designed by the Surveyor’s Department in 1854.

Propulsion
A two-cylinder horizontal single expansion steam engine by Miller, Ravenhill and Salkeld provided  through a single screw, and gave a top speed of about 11 knots.

Sail plan
All Vigilant-class gunvessels were barque-rigged.

Armament
Although designed with a pair of 68-pounder Lancaster muzzle-loading rifles, the Vigilant class were finished with one / Armstrong breech-loading gun, one  Lancaster muzzle-loading rifled gun and two 20-pounder breech loaders.

Construction
Surprise was ordered on 26 July 1855 at the same time as nine others of her class.  Her keel was laid at the Blackwall yard of Money Wigram & Son on 30 August and she was launched on 6 March 1856.

History
From 18 March 1856 she was commanded by Commander Charles Egerton Harcourt-Vernon, and he commissioned her at Blackwall on 12 April the same year. From 1857 under Commander Cresswell the ship served in the East Indies including the Second Anglo-Chinese War, and from 1861 she formed part of the Mediterranean Fleet. Between August 1864 and 24 April 1866 she was commanded by George Tryon, later to become infamous as the Admiral who caused the loss in 1893 of his flagship HMS Victoria during fleet manoeuvres.

Disposal
Surprise was sold to Marshall of Plymouth and broken up in November 1866.

Commanding officers

References

Sources

Vigilant-class gunvessels
Ships built by the Blackwall Yard
1856 ships
Victorian-era gunboats of the United Kingdom